Jkvr. Christine Wilhelmine Isabelle Wttewaall van Stoetwegen (1 January 1901 – 15 October 1986) was a Dutch lawyer, feminist and politician who was member of the House of Representatives for the Christian Historical Union (CHU) from 1945 until 1971.

References

1901 births
1986 deaths
People from Amsterdam
Dutch politicians
Dutch feminists
1950s in the Netherlands
1960s in the Netherlands
Jonkvrouws of the Netherlands